Gábor Andreánszky may refer to:
 Gábor Andreánszky (politician) (1848–1908), Hungarian politician and Member of Parliament 
 Gábor Andreánszky (botanist) (1895–1967), Hungarian botanist and son of the above